Andrey Kozlov (1965 – 2006) was a Russian banker.

Andrei Kozlov may also refer to:

 Andrei Kozlov (footballer, born 1973), Russian football player and manager
 Andrei Kozlov (footballer, born 1989), Russian football player
  (born 1982), Russian weightlifter